Carol Hill-Evans (born November 21, 1949) is an American politician who has served in the Pennsylvania House of Representatives from the 95th district since 2017.

Early life and career
Hill-Evans was born and raised in York, Pennsylvania, and graduated from William Penn High School. She earned her Bachelor of Science in business from Penn State York in 2001. She was a member of the York City Council from 2008 to 2016, during which time she served terms as city council vice president and city council president.

Pennsylvania House of Representatives
Hill-Evans was first elected to the Pennsylvania House of Representatives in 2016, defeating Republican opponent Joel Sears in the general election. She ran unopposed in the 2018 general election, and fended off Republican challenger Kacey French in 2020.

During her tenure in the state legislature, she has served on the house Committee on Ethics, the Education Committee, the Tourism & Recreational Development Committee, the Local Government Committee, and the Veterans Affairs & Emergency Preparedness Committee.

References

1949 births
Living people
Democratic Party members of the Pennsylvania House of Representatives
African-American state legislators in Pennsylvania
21st-century American politicians
21st-century African-American politicians
Women in Pennsylvania politics
Women state legislators in Pennsylvania
21st-century American women politicians
21st-century African-American women
African-American women in politics
20th-century African-American women